The Miami River is a  stream in upstate New York and is a part of the Hudson River watershed.

See also
List of rivers of New York

References

Adirondacks
Rivers of New York (state)
Tributaries of the Hudson River
Rivers of Hamilton County, New York